Aga Khan Award may refer to:
Aga Khan Award for Architecture
Aga Khan Prize for Fiction, given by the editors of the Paris Review